The 2018 Horizon League women's soccer tournament was the postseason women's soccer tournament for the Horizon League. It was held from October 29 through November 3, 2018. The quarterfinals of the tournament were held at campus sites, while semifinals and final took place at Engelmann Field in Milwaukee, Wisconsin. The six team single-elimination tournament consisted of three rounds based on seeding from regular season conference play. The IUPUI Jaguars were the defending champions, but they did not qualify for the 2018 tournament after finishing the regular season in seventh place. The Milwaukee Panthers won the tournament by beating the Cleveland State Vikings 1–0 in the final.

Bracket

Semifinal matchups were determined by the results of the quarterfinals. The #1 seed would play the lowest-remaining seed, while the #2 seed would play the other quarterfinal winner.

Schedule

Quarterfinals

Semifinals

Final

Statistics

Goalscorers 
1 Goal
 Lauren Bos - Oakland
 Caitlin Carroll - Detroit Mercy
 Kelli Doyle - Detroit Mercy
 Sydnye Gagner - Oakland
 Kailey Ivins - Northern Kentucky
 Rafferty Kugle - Milwaukee
 Julie Ann Piechocki - Detroit Mercy
 Jenna Prathapa - Cleveland State
 Alexa Sabbagh - Oakland
 Keli Swenson - Milwaukee
 Cleveland State (team)

All-Tournament team

Source:

See also 
 2018 Horizon League Men's Soccer Tournament

References 

2018 Horizon League women's soccer season
Horizon League Women's Soccer Tournament